National Radio 1 is an English speaking national online radio station operated by TDK Media Ltd in Cyprus, playing a mix from the 1980s, 1990s and today. The station is aimed at the English speaking residents and visitors to the island. National Radio 1 was launched on 26 April 2008 and operates 24 hours a day providing a programme of music, entertaining features, and Cyprus and world news.

History
In early January 2007, a group of radio presenters, marketing consultants and investors came together with the idea of bringing a new English speaking national radio station to Cyprus. Although there are a number of Greek/English stations throughout Cyprus there were no English only speaking stations transmitting nationally. English is widely spoken across the island and is taught as part of the education system from an early age in all schools.

On 26 April 2007 National Radio 1 switched over to its Dallas, Texas United States server and began broadcasting online across the country and to the rest of Europe. The first song played on National Radio 1 was Take That, Never Forget, chosen by the CEO of TDK Media Ltd in recognition of the hard work by the team to get that station off the ground.

National Radio 1 broadcasts 24 hours a day from Broadcasting House in Paphos, Cyprus, near Carrefour Supermarket.

Studio 1
Studio 1 is where the live programs are produced, presented and broadcast 24 hours day.

Equipment used in studio 1
Audio Enhanced DPS 2008 Automation Software
Evolution Scheduler
Solidyne 2300XL Digital Console
Cool Edit Pro
Winamp Internet Streamer

Presenters and shows

Monday - Friday
Ross & Angie In The Morning. 6am - 11am
Matthew Edmondson's Interactive Lunch. 11am - 3pm
Tom On Drive. 3pm - 7pm
Music Overdrive. 7pm - 10pm

Saturday
Kat On Brekkie. 6am - 11am
The Big Weekend with Chris & Wendi. 11am - 3pm, 3pm - 7pm
Hairbrush Divas. 7pm - 10pm

Sunday
Kat On Brekkie. 6am - 11am
The Big Weekend with Chris & Wendi. 11am - 3pm, 3pm - 7pm
Hit Call UK. 7pm - 10pm

Studio 2 - news
Studio 2 is where the live news is research, produced and presented at the top of each hour between 6 am & 6 pm weekdays and 6 am & 11 am at weekends.

The news is gathered from across the island from:
Cyprus Mail
Cyprus News Agency
Famagusta Gazette
Cyprus Weekly
Emergency Services Press Departments

News team
Amanda Day - weekday news presenter
Karon Leese - weekend news presenter

Studio 3 - Live Lounge
National Radio 1 hosts bands and acts from across the island as well as interviewing celebrities who perform in Cyprus.

External links
Solidyne Digital Power
Audio Enhanced DPS2008
Cyprus News Agency

Radio stations in Cyprus
Radio stations established in 2008